Kazungula is a village in the far north of Botswana, 8 km east of the town of Kasane.  It lies on the south bank of the Chobe and Zambezi rivers.

Kazungula is the site of border crossings to the town in Zambia, also called Kazungula, across the Zambezi by the Kazungula Ferry and Kazungula Bridge, and to Zimbabwe at the Kazungula Road crossing.

Chobe Crocodile Farm is one of the village's most important tourist attractions.

References

North-West District (Botswana)
Villages in Botswana
Botswana–Zambia border crossings
Botswana–Zimbabwe border crossings